Kasetsart University Kamphaeng Saen Campus Stadium is a stadium in Nakhon Pathom, Thailand. It is currently used for football. The stadium holds 4,000 spectators.

External links
Stadium information

Football venues in Thailand
Sport in Nakhon Pathom province
Buildings and structures in Nakhon Pathom province